The emperor angelfish (Pomacanthus imperator)  is a species of marine angelfish. It is a reef-associated fish, native to the Indian and Pacific Oceans, from the Red Sea to Hawaii and the Austral Islands.  This species is generally associated with stable populations and faces no major threats of extinction. It is a favorite of photographers, artists, and aquarists because of its unique, brilliant pattern of coloration.

Description

The emperor angelfish shows a marked difference between the juveniles and the adults. The juveniles have a dark blue body which is marked with concentric curving lines, alternating between pale blue and white with the smallest which are completely enclosed within each other located posteriorly. These lines become vertical at the anterior end. The dorsal fin has a white margin and the caudal fin is transparent. The adults are striped with blue and yellow horizontal stripes, a light blue face with a dark blue mask over the eyes and a yellow caudal fin. There is a blackish band above the pectoral fins, the top of which is at the level of the upper orbit. The front margin of this band is bright blue and the rear margin is a thin yellow line. The anal fin has a dark blue background with lighter blue horizontal stripes. The dorsal fin has 13–14 spines and 17–21 soft rays while the anal fin has 3 spines and 18–21 soft rays.

Distribution
The emperor angelfish has a wide Indo-Pacific distribution. It occurs from the Red Sea southwards along the East African coast to Mozambique and Madagascar, eastwards through the Indian and Pacific Oceans as far as the Tuamotu Islands and the Line Islands. It extends north to the Kansai region and to the southern regions of Japan and south to the Great Barrier Reef of Australia, New Caledonia and the Austral Islands in French Polynesia. Vagrants have been recorded from Hawaii. It has been recorded at several sites off the coast of Florida and off Puerto Rico, and since 2009 as a recent introduction to the eastern Mediterranean basin where it now found in low numbers in a number of localities.

Habitat and biology
The adults are found in areas where there is a rich growth of corals on clear lagoon, channel, or seaward reefs. Here they are normally observed underneath ledges and within caves. The subadults are frequently recorded in cavities in reefs and along surge channels on seaward reefs. The juveniles frequently shelter below ledges, in reef cavities and in relatively sheltered areas in channels and over outer reef flats. It’s diet comprises sponges and other encrusting organisms, as well as tunicates. They form pairs. The juveniles and adults may act as cleaner fish, cleaning ectoparasites off larger fishes. When frightened, these fish can produce a knocking sound.

Systematics
The emperor angelfish was first formally described in 1787 as Chaetodon imperator by the German physician and naturalist Marcus Elieser Bloch (1723–1799) with the type locality given as Japan. Some authorities place this species in the subgenus Acanthochaetodon. The specific name imperator means “emperor” and reflects the Dutch name Keyser van Iapan meaning “Emperor of Japan” coined by the publisher Louis Renard (ca. 1678-1746) in 1719, possibly reflecting its majestic appearance.

Utilisation
The emperor angelfish is common in the aquarium trade.

References

External links
Froese, R. and D. Pauly, Eds. Pomacanthus imperator. FishBase. 2017.
Schofield, P. J. Pomacanthus imperator. U.S. Geological Survey, Nonindigenous Aquatic Species Database.
Emperor Angelfish. National Aquarium.
 

Pomacanthus
Fish of Palau
Fish described in 1787